Hanover is a city in Wright and Hennepin counties in the U.S. state of Minnesota. The population was 2,938 at the 2010 census.  Hanover is mainly located within Wright County; only a small part of the city extends into Hennepin County.

Even though Hanover is partly in the metropolitan county of Hennepin, it does not fall under the jurisdiction of the Twin Cities Metropolitan Council.

History
Hanover was laid out in 1877 and named after Hanover, in Germany, the native land of some of the early settlers. A post office has been in operation at Hanover since 1877. Hanover was incorporated in 1891. One property in Hanover, the 1885 Hanover Bridge, is listed on the National Register of Historic Places.

Geography
County Road 19 serves as a main route in the city.

Hanover is located along the Crow River. The river flows through the Downtown River District, and serves as the boundary line between Hennepin and Wright counties.

Nearby places include St. Michael, Albertville, Rogers, Maple Grove, Corcoran, Greenfield, Rockford, Buffalo and Montrose.

The singer and Minnesota native Bob Dylan used to own a ranch near Hanover in Hennepin County.

Education
Most of Hanover is located in the Buffalo–Hanover–Montrose School District. It has its own elementary school for grades K–5. For grades 6–8, students in the area are bused to Buffalo Community Middle School in Buffalo, Minnesota. Several elementary schools in the district follow this procedure. The high school for the district, Buffalo High School, is also located in Buffalo. It is known for its arts magnet program.

Portions of Hanover are also located in the St. Michael-Albertville (STMA) School District.

Demographics

2010 census
At the 2010 census, there were 2,938 people, 926 households and 807 families living in the city. The racial makeup was 96.0% White, 0.6% African American, 0.2% Native American, 1.5% Asian, 0.7% from other races, and 1.0% from two or more races. Hispanic or Latino of any race were 1.7% of the population.

There were 926 households, of which 56.9% had children under the age of 18 living with them, 77.4% were married couples living together, 4.9% had a female householder with no husband present, 4.9% had a male householder with no wife present, and 12.9% were non-families. 9.0% of all households were made up of individuals, and 1.5% had someone living alone who was 65 years of age or older. The average household size was 3.17 and the average family size was 3.36.

The median age was 32.5 years. 34.8% of residents were under the age of 18; 4.8% were between the ages of 18 and 24; 34.3% were from 25 to 44; 22.7% were from 45 to 64; and 3.5% were 65 years of age or older. The gender makeup was 51.4% male and 48.6% female.

2000 census
At the 2000 census, of there were 1,355 people, 440 households and 370 families living in the city. The racial makeup was 98.75% White, 0.07% Native American, 0.37% Asian, and 0.81% from two or more races. Hispanic or Latino of any race were 0.59% of the population.

There were 440 households, of which 48.0% had children under the age of 18 living with them, 76.4% were married couples living together, 3.9% had a female householder with no husband present, and 15.7% were non-families. 12.7% of all households were made up of individuals, and 4.3% had someone living alone who was 65 years of age or older. The average household size was 3.08 and the average family size was 3.38.

33.4% of the population were under the age of 18, 7.3% from 18 to 24, 36.0% from 25 to 44, 18.7% from 45 to 64, and 4.6% who were 65 years of age onr older. The median age was 34 years. For every 100 females, there were 100.7 males. For every 100 females age 18 and over, there were 104.8 males.

The median household income was $73,667 and the median family income was $79,809. Males had a median income of $47,462 and females $32,452. The per capita income was $27,826. About 0.8% of families and 0.9% of the population were below the poverty line, including 0.9% of those under age 18 and 2.8% of those age 65 or over.

Harvest Festival
The Hanover Harvest Festival takes place annually on the first weekend in August. The festival consists of many activities including a 5K run, Kids Fun Run, Miss Hanover Competition, fireworks, parade and car show.

Miss Hanover Royalty Program
The Hanover Harvest Festival Royalty Program was begun in 2009 by Jackie Heinz who currently runs the program. To participate in the contest, requirements include being a rising senior in high school up to 22 years old, and having attended school in Hanover or lived in the area, or attended a local private school.  The contest consists of contestants being judged on various criteria including accomplishments, community activities, club/office membership and future goals pertaining to education and career. They are also judged on poise, dress, answers to interview questions and speech. Each year, two girls are crowned Miss Hanover and Hanover Princess. Miss Hanover has the opportunity to be invited by the Aquatennial Royal Court in Minneapolis to participate in Aquatennial Queen of the Lakes Scholarship Program. If the Queen (Miss Hanover) decides not to participate in Aquatennial, then the opportunity passes to the Princess. Past royalty are:

Miss Hanover
 Dana Bjorge 2009–2010
 Kenzie Haight 2010–2011
 Kaelie Lund 2011–2012
 Amanda Jendro 2012–2013
 Krystle Brown 2013-2014
 Mallory Gutknecht 2014-2015
 Belle Wanke 2015-2016
 Abigail Staggert 2016-2017

References

External links
 Hanover official city government website

Cities in Wright County, Minnesota
Cities in Hennepin County, Minnesota
Cities in Minnesota